Jewel Melanie Burks Solomon is an American tech entrepreneur and venture capitalist working as the first head of Google for Startups in the U.S. She is managing partner of the investment firm, Collab Capital, focusing on Black entrepreneurship. Burks Solomon was previously the Google entrepreneur in residence for diversity markets from January 2014 to October 2016.

Early life 
Jewel Burks Solomon is from Nashville, Tennessee. Her mother, Valinda Burks, ran an insurance agency for 25 years. Jewel Burks Solomon's father, William Burks, owned and managed real estate properties, convenience stores, and a laundromat. In the 1960s, her grandfather, Bill McDaniel, founded businesses in Mobile, Alabama. Burks Solomon began working at a young age for the family businesses.

She studied business at Howard University, graduating in 2010.

Career 

Burks Solomon began her career at Google in Mountain View, California as a BOLD intern the summer of 2009. She was a full time enterprise sales associate for Google Enterprise from 2010 to 2012. 

Burks Solomon moved back to Atlanta after her grandmother's breast cancer diagnosis. She worked at McMaster-Carr as a customer service manager but noticed major technological deficiencies. This prompted Burks Solomon to cofound PartPic in 2013 with Jason Crain. The startup allowed people to use smartphones to search for parts using computer vision technology. 

Burks Solomon served as the Google entrepreneur in residence for diversity markets from January 2014 to October 2016. PartPic was acquired by Amazon in 2016. Burks Solomon left Google to oversee the integration of PartPic's technology with the Amazon mobile app. The technology became Amazon PartFinder.

In January 2020, Burks Solomon became the first head of Google for Startups in the U.S.

Burks Solomon is managing partner of the investment firm, Collab Capital. The firm focuses on Black entrepreneurs.

See also 

 Women in venture capital

References

External links 

 

Living people
Businesspeople from Tennessee
Businesspeople from Atlanta
Year of birth missing (living people)
21st-century American businesswomen
21st-century American businesspeople
African-American business executives
American women chief executives
African-American women in business
American women company founders
American company founders
Howard University alumni
Google people
Google employees
African-American investors
American women investors
American venture capitalists
Amazon (company) people
21st-century African-American women
21st-century African-American people